Kyösti Kalevi Laasonen (born 27 September 1945) is an archer from Finland, who was born in Kitee, Finland.

Laasonen competed for Finland in the 1972 Summer Olympics held in Munich, Germany in the individual event where he finished in third place behind American John Williams and Sweden's Gunnar Jervill.  Four years later he finished 15th at the 1976 Summer Olympics held in Montreal, Quebec,  Canada followed by 7th and 28th in the 1980 Summer Olympics  and 1984 Summer Olympics respectively.

His brother Kauko Laasonen also competed in the 1976 Summer Olympics finishing in 20th position.

References 

 

1945 births
Living people
People from Kitee
Finnish male archers
Olympic archers of Finland
Olympic bronze medalists for Finland
Archers at the 1972 Summer Olympics
Archers at the 1976 Summer Olympics
Archers at the 1980 Summer Olympics
Archers at the 1984 Summer Olympics
Olympic medalists in archery
World Archery Championships medalists
Medalists at the 1972 Summer Olympics
Sportspeople from North Karelia